Fire agate, a variety of chalcedony, is a semi-precious natural gemstone discovered so far only in certain areas of central and northern Mexico and the southwestern United States (New Mexico, Arizona and California). Approximately 24-36 million years ago these areas were subjected to massive volcanic activity during the Tertiary Period. The fire agates were formed during this period of volcanism when hot water, saturated with silica and iron oxide, repeatedly filled cracks and bubbles in the surrounding rock.

Fire agates have beautiful iridescent rainbow colors, similar to opal, with a measurement of hardness on the Mohs scale of between 5 and 7 which reduces the occurrence of scratching when polished gemstones are set in jewelry. The vibrant iridescent rainbow colors found within fire agates, created by the Schiller effect as found in mother-of-pearl, is caused by the alternating silica and iron oxide layers which diffract and allow light to pass and form an interference of colors within the microstructure layering of the stone causing the fire effect for which it is named.

External links

Agates